Bureau Township is one of twenty-five townships in Bureau County, Illinois, US.  As of the 2020 census, its population was 278 and it contained 126 housing units.

Geography

Cemeteries
Two cemeteries are located within the township:
 West Bureau Cemetery (also known as Cross Cemetery), near Wyanet
 Roggy Cemetery, near Walnut

Airports and landing strips
 Naffziger Landing Strip, near Limerick and Kasbeer

Demographics
As of the 2020 census there were 278 people, 35 households, and 35 families residing in the township. The racial makeup of the township was 95.32% White, 0.00% African American, 0.36% Native American, 0.00% Asian, 0.00% Pacific Islander, 1.08% from other races, and 3.24% from two or more races. Hispanic or Latino of any race were 2.88% of the population.

There were 35 households, out of which 31.40% had children under the age of 18 living with them, 100.00% were married couples living together, 0.00% had a female householder with no spouse present, and none were non-families. No households were made up of individuals. The average household size was 2.29 and the average family size was 2.29.

The township's age distribution consisted of 12.5% under the age of 18, none from 18 to 24, 12.5% from 25 to 44, 13.8% from 45 to 64, and 61.3% who were 65 years of age or older. The median age was 74.1 years. For every 100 females, there were 77.8 males. For every 100 females age 18 and over, there were 100.0 males.

The median income for a household in the township was $75,795, and the median income for a family was $75,795. The per capita income for the township was $36,649.

School districts
 Bureau Valley Community Unit School District 340

Political districts
 Illinois' 11th congressional district
 State House District 74
 State Senate District 37

References
 
 United States Census Bureau 2007 TIGER/Line Shapefiles
 United States National Atlas

External links
 City-Data.com
 Illinois State Archives entry for Bureau County

Townships in Bureau County, Illinois
Populated places established in 1849
Townships in Illinois
1849 establishments in Illinois